Sestao River Club is a Spanish football team based in Sestao, in the autonomous community of Basque Country. Founded in 1996 it plays in Segunda División RFEF – Group 2, holding home games at Estadio Las Llanas, with a capacity of 8,905 seats.

History
Sestao River Club was founded in 1996, immediately after the disappearance of historic Sestao Sport Club, due to economic problems. It first reached the third division in 2004, going on to remain there for the vast majority of the following years.

In 2014 the club finished as champion of the group 2 of the Segunda División B, but failed to promote to Segunda División after being eliminated in the play-offs.

Club background
Sestao Sport Club – (1916–1996)
Sestao River Club – (1996–present)

Season by season

Sestao Sport Club
 
17 seasons in Segunda División
10 seasons in Segunda División B
30 seasons in Tercera División

Sestao River Club

11 seasons in Segunda División B
2 seasons in Segunda División RFEF
11 seasons in Tercera División
3 seasons in Categorías Regionales

Current squad

Famous players

References

External links

Official website 
Futbolme team profile 
Club & stadium history  Estadios de España 

Football clubs in the Basque Country (autonomous community)
Association football clubs established in 1996
 
1996 establishments in Spain
Sport in Biscay